German submarine U-279 was a Type VIIC U-boat of Nazi Germany's Kriegsmarine during World War II.

The submarine was laid down on 31 March 1942 at the Bremer Vulkan yard at Bremen-Vegesack as yard number 44. She was launched on 16 December 1942 and commissioned on 3 February 1943 under the command of Kapitänleutnant Otto Franke.

Design
German Type VIIC submarines were preceded by the shorter Type VIIB submarines. U-279 had a displacement of  when at the surface and  while submerged. She had two shafts and two  propellers.

U-279 was fitted with five  torpedo tubes (four fitted at the bow and one at the stern), fourteen torpedoes, one  SK C/35 naval gun, 220 rounds, and two twin  C/30 anti-aircraft guns. The boat had a complement of between forty-four and sixty.

Service history
U-279 served with the 8th U-boat Flotilla for training from February to July 1943 and operationally with the 9th flotilla from 1 August 1943. She carried out one patrol, but sank no ships. She was a member of one wolfpack.

Patrol and loss
The boat departed Kiel on 4 September 1943. She entered the Atlantic Ocean after negotiating the gap between Iceland and the Faroe Islands. She was sunk exactly a month after her departure (4 October), by depth charges dropped from a US Ventura aircraft southwest of Iceland. There were men in boats and in the water, but the Ventura could not call for assistance. Its radio had been put out of commission during the attack.

Forty-eight men died; there were no survivors.

Wolfpacks
U-279 took part in one wolfpack, namely:
 Rossbach (24 September – 4 October 1943)

Previously recorded fate
The submarine was initially categorized as having been sunk by a British Liberator southwest of Iceland on 4 October 1943.

References

Bibliography

External links

German Type VIIC submarines
U-boats commissioned in 1943
U-boats sunk in 1943
U-boats sunk by US aircraft
World War II submarines of Germany
World War II shipwrecks in the Atlantic Ocean
1943 ships
Ships built in Bremen (state)
U-boats sunk by depth charges
Ships lost with all hands
Maritime incidents in October 1943